Ioan Petcu (born 1 May 1959, in Hunedoara) is a retired Romanian footballer who played as a midfielder. After his retirement, Petcu started the manager career and from 1995 to 2012 he coached teams like Corvinul Hunedoara, Unirea Sânnicolau Mare, Bihor Oradea, FC Hunedoara or Mureșul Deva. He also promoted to Liga II with Unirea Sânnicolau Mare, the best performance in the history of this club. After 2012 he was the vice-president of FC Hunedoara. From June 2018 he is the manager of Liga III side Cetate Deva.

Honours
Corvinul Hunedoara
Liga II: 1979–80

References

External links
 
 

1959 births
Living people
Sportspeople from Hunedoara
Romanian footballers
Romania international footballers
Association football midfielders
Liga I players
Liga II players
CS Corvinul Hunedoara players
Nemzeti Bajnokság I players
Diósgyőri VTK players
Romanian expatriate footballers
Romanian expatriate sportspeople in Cyprus
Expatriate footballers in Cyprus
Romanian expatriate sportspeople in Hungary
Expatriate footballers in Hungary
Romanian football managers
FC Bihor Oradea managers
CS Corvinul Hunedoara managers
CSM Deva managers